This is a list of episodes from the fifth season of Impractical Jokers.

Episodes

References

External links 
 Official website
 

Impractical Jokers
2016 American television seasons